The 1st Parliament of Pakistan was the unicameral legislature of Pakistan formed after the partition of India. There were 100 Members of Parliament, including 44 from East Bengal, 17 from West Punjab, 3 from the Northwest Frontier Province, 4 from Sindh, and 1 from Balochistan. Four of West Punjab's 17 allocated seats laid vacant.

East Bengal

 Abdullah al Mahmood
 Abdullah el Baqui
 Abdul Hamid
 Abdul Kasem Khan
 Mohammad Akram Khan
 A. M. A. Hamid
 Azizuddin Ahmad
 Muhammad Habibullah Bahar
 Prem Hari Barma
 Raj Kumar Chakraverty
 Sris Chandra Chattopadhyaya
 Abdul Matin Chaudhary
 Murtaza Raza Choudhry
 Hamidul Huq Choudhury
 Akhay Kumar Das
 Dhirendranath Datta
 Bhupendra Kumar Datta
 Ebrahim Khan
 A. K. Fazlul Huq
 Fazlur Rahman
 Ghayasuddin Pathan
 Shaista Suhrawardy Ikramullah
 Liaquat Ali Khan
 Mafizuddin Ahmad
 Mahmud Hussain
 Jnanendra Chandra Majumdar
 A. M. Malik
 Birat Chandra Mandal
 Jogendra Nath Mandal
 Mohammed Ali
 Khawaja Nazimuddin
 Nur Ahmed
 Nurul Amin
 Ishtiaq Hussain Qureshi
 Dhananjoy Roy
 Maudi Bhakesh Chanda
 Serajul Islam
 Shabbir Ahmad Usmani
 Khwaja Shahabuddin
 Huseyn Shaheed Suhrawardy
 Harendra Kumar Sur
 Tamizuddin Khan
 Kawivi Kerwar Datta
 Malik Ghulam Muhammad

West Punjab
Mian Mumtaz Mohammad Khan Daultana
Ganga Saran
Zafarullah Khan
Iftikhar Hussain Khan
Mian Muhammad Iftikharuddin
Muhammad Ali Jinnah
Sheikh Karamat Ali
Nazir Ahmad Khan
Sardar Abdur Rab Nistar
Feroz Khan Noon
Omar Hayat Malik
Shah Nawaz Begum Jahan Ara
Sardar Shaukat Hyat Khan

Northwest Frontier Province
Khan Abdul Ghaffar Khan
Khan Sardar Bahadur Khan
Sardar Asad Ullah Jan Khan

Sindh
Abdus Sattar Abdur Rahman
Alhajj Muhammad Hashim Gazder
Muhammad Ayub Khuhro

Balochistan
S. B. Nawab Mohammad Khan Jogezai

CHANGES FROM JULY 1949-1954 
This is list of changes in memberson first constituteassembly from July 1949 – 1954.

See also 

 List of members of the 1st National Assembly of Pakistan
 List of members of the 2nd National Assembly of Pakistan
 List of members of the 3rd National Assembly of Pakistan
 List of members of the 4th National Assembly of Pakistan
 List of members of the 5th National Assembly of Pakistan
 List of members of the 6th National Assembly of Pakistan
 List of members of the 7th National Assembly of Pakistan
 List of members of the 8th National Assembly of Pakistan
 List of members of the 9th National Assembly of Pakistan
 List of members of the 10th National Assembly of Pakistan
 List of members of the 11th National Assembly of Pakistan
 List of members of the 12th National Assembly of Pakistan
 List of members of the 13th National Assembly of Pakistan
 List of members of the 14th National Assembly of Pakistan
 List of members of the 15th National Assembly of Pakistan

References

External links
 National Assembly of Pakistan

 
Lists of members of the National Assembly of Pakistan by term